AdventHealth Stadium, located in Rome, Georgia,  has been the home of the Rome Braves, of the South Atlantic League, since its completion in April 2003. The facility seats 5,105 people.

History 
At the end of the 2002 season, the Atlanta Braves decided to move their Class A Macon Braves. The move came after disputes between the city of Macon and the team over a new ballpark. The city of Rome, Georgia was able to get the approval of SPLOST and lure the Braves to Rome. Using completely SPLOST tax the ballpark was funded and was ready for use in the 2003 season. The construction cost $19 million which is worth $26.7 million in 2020. The stadium has under gone many renovations, the most recent being in 2021. The renovation included a new video board, brand new speaker system, led lights, and more.

Naming Rights
The naming rights were sold to Rome-based State Mutual Insurance Company on February 28, 2003.  The terms of the agreement were $250,000 for 18 years. In April 2022, the naming rights were sold to non-profit health care system AdventHealth.

Features

The stadium contains 14 luxury suites, a full-service restaurant, and a group pavilion. Among other reasons, the (relatively) large size of the playing field helps this to be among the least home run-friendly parks in all of minor-league baseball. The stadium is comparable to the Lexington Legends Whitaker Bank Ballpark which was designed by the same architects. The stadium also includes the Miller Lite Marina which is a party deck located down the left field foul line that is decked out with a boat over looking the field.

References

External links

Official Website
State Mutual Stadium Views - Ball Parks of the Minor Leagues

Sports venues in Georgia (U.S. state)
Minor league baseball venues
Baseball venues in Georgia (U.S. state)
Buildings and structures in Rome, Georgia
Sports venues completed in 2003
2003 establishments in Georgia (U.S. state)
South Atlantic League ballparks